Dark Age of Reason is the first album by the Swedish band Arcana. It has been compared to the early works by Dead Can Dance.

Track listing

 "Our God Weeps" -02:04
 "Angel of Sorrow" -03:13
 "Source of Light" -03:07
 "The Calm before the Storm" -03:00
 "Dark Age of Reason" -07:09
 "Like Statues in the Garden of Dreaming" -03:03
 "The Oath" -03:36
 "...For My Love" -02:22
 "Serenity" -06:07
 "The Song of Mourning" -03:47

References

Arcana (Swedish band) albums
1996 albums